Oisemont is a commune in the Somme department in Hauts-de-France in northern France.

Geography

Population

History
 The name has its origins in Celtic religion and mythology, as ‘mont of Ésus. Over the centuries, it has been known as Ossemons, Aussemons and Wessemont. There is evidence pointing to Acheulean origins and Roman occupation.
 By 1275, the town was the seat of the provost of the Vimeu.
 The Templars of Acheux became a part of the bailiwick of Oisemont, setting up a preceptory of the house of Aisseu.
 In 1307, a second headquarters was set up by the Knights Hospitaller. The building still stands today, in the ‘rue de la Commanderie’, as do several other historic buildings
 The castle was destroyed in 1346 by the army of Edward III during the Hundred Years War. It had defensive ramparts to protect the inhabitants in times of attack. It was rebuilt and destroyed again in 1370 by John of Gaunt.
 A Templar hospital was built on the site of the present old-peoples’ home. All that remains is a stone cross.
 The year 1472 saw Charles the Bold set fire to the town, reducing it to ashes.
 During the Wars of Religion of the 16th century, the town was an important Protestant centre. By the 17th century, the Huguenots were hiding in underground passages for protection.

Places of interest
The mairie (town hall)
 The old windmill. Sitting in the middle of a field, a little way from the town, the brick-built windmill is missing its sails, roofing and windows and is completely abandoned.
 The twelfth-century church of Saint-Martin, with a Romanesque entrance and a 42m tower. Restored in 1808, the nave collapsed in 1953 and it was then demolished. The new church was completed in March 1960
 The war memorials
 The Museum of Local Art, opened in 1976
 The market hall, built in 1853
 The old railway line, which served as freight transport, but also for passengers, was opened in 1872 and closed in 1993
 The ruins of the 17th-century château. An entrance gate and octagonal tower are all that remain.

Personalities
 Charles Dumont de Sainte-Croix: 1758-1830, Ornithologist

See also
Communes of the Somme department

References

External links

 The old railway from Longpré-les-corps to St.Gamaches 

Communes of Somme (department)